KF Harkëtari was a football club located in Klos, Albania. It was founded in 1939 as Shoqeria Sportive e Klosit. The club has always played in the lower divisions but many times has produced beautiful games especially in the Albanian Cup. The club folded in 1991 after the communism in Albania fell and since then Klos has never had a professional team.

Defunct football clubs in Albania
Association football clubs established in 1939
Association football clubs disestablished in 1991
1939 establishments in Albania
1991 disestablishments in Albania
Klos (municipality)